Tic Tac is a Chilean telenovela produced by TVN. It was written by Jorge Marchant Lazcano, Perla Devoto, Maité Chapero and Jimmy Daccarett, and directed by María Eugenia Rencoret.

The soundtrack of the soap opera was based primarily on the album Tributo a Queen, with cover versions of songs by the group interpreted by the Latin artists Illya Kuryaki & The Valderramas, Soda Stereo, Molotov, Fito Paez and Aterciopelados.

Plot
After a seance, the ghost of a young high-class young man, Maximilian Ossa, (Enrique Cintolesi), who died in very strange circumstances, comes from 1925 to 1997 to recover the love of his beloved Pola Santa Maria (Leonor Varela).

In 1997, Pola is the great-niece of his beloved, and physically identical with the same name, with whom he falls in love. There is also a named Nicolas (Francisco Pérez-Bannen) Hunt Mysteries who, for his radio program, Magik Radio, tries to prove that Max is a ghost, well away from Pola, who also is in love.

Cast
 Enrique Cintolesi https://es.wikipedia.org/wiki/Enrique_Cintolesi  - Maximiliano Ossa
 Leonor Varela - Pola Santa María
 Bastián Bodenhöfer - Tomás Barcelona
 Ximena Rivas - Eva Félix
 Coca Guazzini - Ivana Gabor
 Mauricio Pesutic - Ángel Mendizábal / Ángela Smith
 Peggy Cordero - Emilia Santa María
 Jaime Vadell - Samuel Gaete
 Anita Klesky - Rosario Pascal
 Ana Reeves - Victoria Grant
 Edgardo Bruna - Renato Puig
 Adriana Vacarezza - Calú Barcelona
 Solange Lackington - Iris Valdés
 Francisco Pérez-Bannen - Nicolás Urrutia
 Alejandra Fosalba - Samantha Rouge
 Roberto Artiagoitía - Memo
 Mónica Godoy - Isidora Ortúzar
 Yuyuniz Navas - Romina Gaete
 Nicolás Fontaine - Matías Mendizábal
 Remigio Remedy - Gaspar "Roca" García
 Pamela Villalba - Dominique Aldunate
 Paulo Meza - Charly Troncoso
 Paola Volpato - Jocelyn Miranda
 Claudio Arredondo - Antonio "Toño"
 Blanca Lewin - Macarena Mendizábal
 Íñigo Urrutia - Ignacio García
 Carola Derpsch - María José Donoso
 Pedro Villagra - José María
 Jorge Hevia Jr. - Diego Gaete
 Antonella Orsini - Aurora Aldunate
 Clemente Gómez - Andrés Mendizábal

References 

1997 telenovelas
1997 Chilean television series debuts
1997 Chilean television series endings
Chilean telenovelas
Televisión Nacional de Chile telenovelas
Spanish-language telenovelas